Leonardo Pérez (born 27 September 1989) is an Italian professional footballer who plays for  club Messina.

Career
Perez began his career on youth side for Brindisi and was 2007 scouted by Bari. He played two years in the primavera team of Bari and he was loaned him later for the rest of the 2009–10 season to Lega Pro Seconda Divisione team A.S. Gubbio 1910

In August 2010 he joined Pisa in co-ownership deal for a peppercorn of €250. In June 2011 Bari gave up the remain 50% registration rights to Pisa.

Perez was signed by Serie B club Cittadella in July 2013 in another co-ownership deal. In 2014, he was signed by Ascoli on loan, with an option to purchase.

Pérez wore No. 9 shirt for the Serie B newcomer in 2015–16 season.

On 31 January 2019, he joined Piacenza on loan.

On 20 August 2019, he signed with Virtus Francavilla.

On 14 January 2021, he moved to Arezzo.

He returned to Virtus Francavilla on 16 June 2021.

On 11 January 2023, Pérez signed with Messina.

References

External links

1989 births
People from Mesagne
Sportspeople from the Province of Brindisi
Footballers from Apulia
Living people
Italian footballers
Association football forwards
A.S. Gubbio 1910 players
Pisa S.C. players
Giulianova Calcio players
A.S. Cittadella players
Ascoli Calcio 1898 F.C. players
Cosenza Calcio players
Piacenza Calcio 1919 players
Virtus Francavilla Calcio players
S.S. Arezzo players
A.C.R. Messina players
Serie B players
Serie C players